Albert Dell Flair (July 24, 1916 – July 26, 1988) nicknamed "Broadway", was a first baseman in Major League Baseball who played briefly for the Boston Red Sox during the  season. He was born in New Orleans, Louisiana.
 
In one-season career, Flair was a .200 hitter (6-for-30) with three runs and two RBI in 10 games, including two doubles, one triple, and one stolen base. He did not hit a home run. 
 
Flair died in his home of New Orleans, Louisiana, in 1988.

Sources
Baseball Reference
Retrosheet

Boston Red Sox players
Major League Baseball first basemen
Baseball players from New Orleans
1916 births
1988 deaths